The 41st Curtis Cup Match was played from 26–28 August 2021 at Conwy Golf Club near Conwy, Wales. It was originally scheduled for 12–14 June 2020 but was postponed to 2021 in response to the COVID-19 pandemic.

Great Britain & Ireland had the better of the first day and led to by 4 points to 1 points at the end of the day. The USA team levelled the match at 6 points a piece by the end of the second day. The third day singles matches were initially very tight but ultimately, most of the matches swung toward the USA team and they secured 6 points of the 8 available. The USA team retained the Curtis Cup with a total score of 12 to 7 for the GB&I team. It was the USA's first away win in the contest since 2008.

Format
The contest was a three-day competition, with three foursomes and three fourball matches on each of the first two days, and eight singles matches on the final day, a total of 20 points.

Each of the 20 matches was worth one point in the larger team competition. If a match ended all square after the 18th hole extra holes were not played. Rather, each side earned  point toward their team total. The team that accumulated at least 10 points won the competition. In the event of a tie, the current holder would have retained the Cup.

Teams
Eight players for Great Britain & Ireland and USA participated in the event plus one non-playing captain for each team.

The Great Britain & Ireland team was announced on 9 August 2021.

Rose Zhang, Rachel Heck and Allisen Corpuz were the first players to make the American team, as the three highest-ranked Americans in the World Amateur Golf Ranking (WAGR) on 21 July 2021. Automatic selection was also given to Jensen Castle, the winner of the 2021 U.S. Women's Amateur, which finished on 8 August. The winner of the 2021 Mark H. McCormack Medal, which was awarded to the number one ranked player in the WAGR after that event, was also guaranteed a place, provided they were American. This was won by Zhang who was already guaranteed a place. The remainder of the team was announced on 9 August.

Note: "Rank" is the World Amateur Golf Ranking as of the start of the Cup.

Thursday's matches

Morning foursomes

Afternoon fourballs

Friday's matches

Morning foursomes

Afternoon fourballs

Saturday's singles matches

Source:

References

External links
The R&A site
USGA site

Curtis Cup
Golf tournaments in Wales
International sports competitions hosted by Wales
Curtis Cup
Curtis Cup
Curtis Cup
Curtis Cup